Clostridium botulinum C3 exoenzyme is a toxin that causes the addition of one or more ADP-ribose moieties to Rho-like proteins. Many bacterial toxins  nucleotide-binding modify by ADP-ribosylation proteins involved in essential cell functions, leading to their toxic effects.

Action
The molecular basis of the action of these enzymes consists in binding of nicotinamide adenine dinucleotide (NAD), splitting NAD into its ADP-ribose and nicotinamide components, and transferring the ADP-ribose moiety to a specific residue on to a protein substrate, often of eukaryotic origin. All the toxins of this family share a highly conserved glutamate, which is the catalytic residue critical for the NAD-glycohydrolase activity. ADP-ribosyltransferase toxins have distinct substrate specificities and variable pathophysiological properties and can be subdivided into four subfamilies: diphtheria-like toxins, cholera-like toxins, binary toxins and C3-like exoenzymes.

C3-like exoenzymes unlike other ADP-ribosyltransferase toxins do not require a specific cell-surface binding translocation component for cell entry. Their specificity is for the small GTP-binding proteins RhoA, RhoB, and RhoC, which are ADP-ribosylated on an asparagine residue.

Bacterial toxins